The Burlington Railroad Overpass is a historic structure northwest of Chariton, Iowa, United States. The Iowa State Highway Commission (ISHC) designed several steel deck arch bridges in the 1930s to replace grade railroad crossings. The three-hinge arch is supported by concrete arch pedestals and was designed to cross the Chicago, Burlington and Quincy Railroad tracks. ISHC contracted with Ben Cole and Son of Ames, Iowa in 1936 to build the structure, which was completed a year later. The roadway has been widened, and guardrails have been replaced in subsequent years. It is the only example of this bridge type left in the state. It was listed on the National Register of Historic Places in 1998.

References

Bridges completed in 1937
Transportation buildings and structures in Lucas County, Iowa
National Register of Historic Places in Lucas County, Iowa
Road bridges on the National Register of Historic Places in Iowa
Arch bridges in Iowa
Steel bridges in the United States